Sarıoğlu may refer to

People
Aylin Sarıoğlu (born 1995), Turkish female volleyball player
Sabri Sarıoğlu (born 1984), Turkish football player

Places
Sarıoğlu, Gerede, a village at Gerede district of Bolu Province in Turkey